CBS News Sunday Morning (normally shortened to Sunday Morning onscreen since 2009) is an American television newsmagazine that has aired on CBS since January 28, 1979. Created by Robert Northshield and original host Charles Kuralt, the 90-minute program currently airs Sundays between 9:00 a.m. to 10:30 a.m. EST, and between 6:00 a.m. to 7:30 a.m. PST. Since October 9, 2016, the program has been hosted by Jane Pauley, who also hosts news segments. Her predescessor, Charles Osgood, hosted Sunday Morning for twenty-two years (and is the program's longest-serving host) after taking over from Kuralt on April 10, 1994.

History
CBS News Sunday Morning was originally conceived to be a broadcast version of a Sunday newspaper magazine supplement, most typified by The New York Times Magazine. The format was conceived as the Sunday equivalent of the CBS Morning News anchored by Bob Scheiffer, which following Sunday Mornings debut was retitled to reflect each day of the week (such as Monday Morning, Tuesday Morning, etc.). Although an attempt to apply the same format to weekday broadcasts proved unsuccessful, the Sunday broadcast survived and retains its original format, including elements of its original graphic and set design. Long after the daily editions ended, Sunday Mornings opening sequence continued to display all seven days of the week until the early 2000s. 

On January 25, 2004, Sunday Morning celebrated its 25th anniversary with clips and highlights from the show's first quarter-century on the air. On February 1, 2009, the program celebrated its 30th anniversary, and segments examined how the world had changed in the three decades its debut, the history of Sundays in the U.S. andas a tie-in to the show's logothe physics of the sun. An artist was commissioned to create new sun logos for the program, which debuted on that edition and were used in future broadcasts. On May 17, 2009, Sunday Morning began broadcasting in high-definition. In 2014, rebroadcasts of the program began airing on sister cable network Smithsonian Channel (owned by CBS's parent company ViacomCBS) but has since been pulled from that channel's programming.

Charles Kuralt era (1979–1994)
On January 28, 1979, CBS launched Sunday Morning with Charles Kuralt as host. On October 27, 1980, he was added as host of the weekday broadcasts of CBS' Morning show as well, joined with Diane Sawyer as weekday co-host on September 28, 1981. Kuralt left the weekday broadcasts in March 1982, but continued to anchor the Sunday edition until April 3, 1994, when he retired after fifteen years as host and was succeeded by Charles Osgood.

Charles Osgood era (1994–2016)
Osgood's first broadcast as host was on April 10, 1994. Ultimately, his tenure of twenty-two years as host exceeded Kuralt's fifteen. Osgood's final broadcast as host was on September 25, 2016.

Among Osgood's personal trademarks were his bow-tie, his weekly signoff ("Until then, I'll see you on the radio") and his propensity for delivering his commentaries in whimsical verse. For example, when the United States Census Bureau invented a designation for cohabitant(s) as "Person(s) of Opposite Sex Sharing Living Quarters", or "POSSLQ", Osgood turned it into a pronounceable three-syllable word and composed a prospective love poem that included these lines, which he later used as the title of one of his books:
"There's nothing that I wouldn't do
If you would be my POSSLQ."

Osgood also regularly pronounced the 21st-century years as "twenty oh one, twenty oh two..." as opposed to the more common "two thousand one, two thousand two", etc.

Jane Pauley era (2016–present)
In 2014, Jane Pauley, a former co-host of NBC's Today, appeared as an interview subject on Sunday Morning; positive audience response to this segment led to Pauley being hired as a contributor to the show later that year. Pauley was elevated to the role of the program's host in 2016, succeeding Osgood, once again making her the anchor of a regular morning news program for the first time in over twenty-five years and becoming her first job as the host of any television program since 2005; she continues in this role as of 2023. Pauley began her role as host on October 9, 2016, nearly forty years to the day since her debut on Today.

Relationships with CBS' weekday morning news programs 

As noted, for the first few years of Sunday Mornings run, CBS News' weekday morning broadcasts were similarly branded Monday Morning through Friday Morning respectively, and were produced on the same set. However, these broadcasts emphasized hard news as opposed to Sunday Mornings focus on feature stories. Originally anchored by Bob Schieffer, Kuralt eventually took over the daily role, and was for a short time joined by Diane Sawyer as co-host. However, the weekday program's then-limited 7:00 a.m. to 8:00 a.m. EST air time (the long-running Captain Kangaroo was entrenched in the 8:00 a.m. hour) hampered its ability to compete with Today on NBC and Good Morning America on ABC, though it expanded to ninety minutes (from 7:30 a.m. to 9:00 a.m. EST) in 1981 and was renamed simply Morning. In 1982, the weekday version was extended to two hours (7:00 a.m. to 9:00 a.m.) and reverted to its previous title as the CBS Morning News, adopting a different set and distinct graphics in the process; by March, Kuralt had been replaced by Bill Kurtis. Meanwhile, Sunday Morning maintained its format and set with Kuralt as host.

For almost all of the next four decades, Sunday Morning and CBS' other morning news programs, under varying names and formats, remained fully separate productions, though with occasional cross-promotion and some sharing of correspondents. On August 31, 2021, the network announced that its weekday morning show would be relaunched for the latest time as CBS Mornings and its Saturday counterpart as CBS Saturday Morning. Under this latest reformatting, both programs have taken on some branding elements of Sunday Morning like its Sun of May-style logo and "Abblasen" fanfare, though in a much more modern studio layout. To date, Sunday Morning itself has not been affected by these changes apart from some minor graphics updates to accommodate a revised CBS bug, which took effect on the September 12 edition.

Format
Each edition follows a story totem pole in the center of the CBS soundstage, with previews of featured stories set to air during the broadcast (the first four of which feature clips from the story packages with preview narration by the respective correspondent) during the introduction. Each story covered in a given episode has a glass plate with its headline on this pole (digitally inserted on the pole as a prepared graphic since the late 2000s), which the camera follows after the host's introductions. Music in the show is usually limited to the opening and closing title theme. The host introduces each story with a short monologue, then sends the show out to the taped segment. The show usually ends with a preview of next week's Sunday Morning broadcast. After the commercial break, there is a thirty-second tranquil nature scene.

For most of its history, the program was typically presented live, with a short summary of national and international news headlines, sports, and a national weather forecast right after the featured story teasers, and a preview of the guests and topics to air on that week's Face the Nation (which follows the program on most CBS stations) near the end of the program. During the occasional weeks that Sunday Morning aired a pre-taped theme broadcast, the headlines segment would instead be presented live by another anchor. By early 2022, observers noted that Sunday Morning had quietly shifted to a pre-taped format; in the event of a major weekend news story, it may be presented with a generic on-set introduction combined with an off-set voiceover by the host.

Notably, Sunday Morning includes significant coverage of the fine and performing arts, including coverage of topics usually not covered in network news, such as architecture, painting, ballet, opera and classical music, though increasingly more popular forms of music have been included as well. The program's correspondents tend to ask nontraditional questions of guests (for instance, actor Brad Pitt was asked about his love of architecture, and Grant Hill about his painting collection). Television essays similar to the kinds delivered on PBS also appear, and the program generally has a stable of equally positive and negative news stories to fill up the program when there is no breaking news of note. Story lengths are longer (lasting up to twelve minutes at a time) and the pace of the program is considerably quieter and more relaxed than CBS Mornings and CBS Saturday Morning, even after those programs began sharing some of Sunday Mornings branding elements. 

Commentators Ben Stein and Nancy Giles appear in recurring segments to deliver opinion commentaries, and correspondent Bill Geist also contributes human interest stories. The program ends with a nature scene, not given a formal title for most of the program's history, but since entitled "Moment of Nature" as it is now a sponsored element.

Despite the stereotype of the program appealing primarily to senior citizens, Sunday Morning has actually placed first in its time slot in the key demographic of adults 25–54, beating all of the political discussion-driven Sunday morning talk shows.

On one occasion, in April 1986, the entire program served as a showcase for classical music when a live broadcast of Vladimir Horowitz's historic Moscow piano recital was aired. For that presentation only, the program departed from its usual newsmagazine format and devoted the entire ninety minutes to a complete presentation of the recital. Because the recital was given at 4:00 p.m. Moscow time, CBS was able to broadcast it at 9:00 a.m. Eastern Time. The presentation was such a critical and popular success that it was repeated two months later and was subsequently released on VHS and DVD.

Segments
 Cover Story:  The main topic of that week's broadcast
 Almanac:  A notable event or the birth or death of a person that happened on the same calendar day of the weekly broadcast
 Profile:  A look at the accomplishments of people
 Pulse:  A look at facts by different sources
 Passage:  A person who died within the past week
 Calendar:  A look at the week ahead
 Moment of Nature:  A look at animals and plants at the end of the weekly broadcast

Title sequence
The original title sequence of Sunday Morning (from its first broadcast on Sunday, Jan. 28, 1979 to about 1991 or 1992) had a film-like look to it. First, a large yellow sun rose up from the bottom to the middle of the screenn; that sun then zoomed back quickly and turned into the CBS Eye (the Eye sprang forward from its position in the middle of the screen and left a trail behind it that the viewer went through. Next, the days of the week (originally Sunday through Friday [owing to that fact that Bob Schieffer had a weekday edition that had each broadcast named for each day of the week, Monday Morning through Friday Morning]; Saturday was added to that graphic around 1984) wiped on the screen with a blind-like effect, flashed quickly, then left the same way. Then, those same days went from the bottom of the screen to the top in a diagonal stair effect in different colors. Finally, Sunday (or whichever day of the week for the weekday Schieffer broadcasts; on those broadcasts, the sequence was shortened, omitting the first two parts) dipped down from the top of the screen to the bottom, leaving a trail behind it, and then went back up to the middle; that flashed, turned white, and then Morning appeared below it as the trail on Sunday disappeared. The full title then flashed as the CBS News name appeared on top of it, and the black screen gave way to a shot of the studio and Charles Kuralt (or whoever was filling in for him in his absence); the studio lights then came up as the music ended.

Production
The program is marked by its distinctive "Sun" logo, which is prominent in the program's title sequence. In addition, in between some segments, images of the sun in various forms also appear. The show's theme is the trumpet fanfare "Abblasen", attributed to Gottfried Reiche. A recording of the piece on a baroque trumpet by Don Smithers was used as the show's theme for many years until producers decided to replace the vinyl recording with a digital of a piccolo trumpet by Doc Severinsen; the current version is played by Wynton Marsalis.

Notable on-air staff

Host

 Jane Pauley (2016–present)

Correspondents

 Serena Altschul
 Rita Braver
 Lee Cowan
 Mo Rocca
 Tracy Smith
 Martha Teichner

Contributors

 Luke Burbank
 David Edelstein – film and television critic
 Bill Flanagan – rock music critic
 Jim Gaffigan – commentator
 Nancy Giles – commentator
 Steve Hartman
 Hua Hsu
 Conor Knighton
 Ted Koppel
 Ben Mankiewicz
 Erin Moriarty
 David Pogue
 Mo Rocca
 Faith Salie – commentator
 Kelefa Sanneh
 Joel Sartore
 Susan Spencer
 Ben Stein – commentator
 Mark Whitaker

Notable former on-air staff

Hosts
 Charles Kuralt (1979–1994; now deceased)
 Charles Osgood (1994–2016; now retired)

Correspondents
 Faith Daniels (1988–1989)
 Bill Geist (1987–2018; now retired)
 John Leonard – film, book and drama critic (1988–2004; now deceased)
 Russ Mitchell – now at WKYC in Cleveland
 Ron Powers – film, book and drama critic (1979–1988)
 Terence Smith – senior correspondent (1990–1998)
 Billy Taylor – jazz and modern music correspondent (1981–2002; now deceased)
 Roger Welsch – Postcards from Nebraska (1988–2001; now deceased)
 Tim Sample – Postcards from Maine (1993–2004)
 Eugenia Zukerman – classical music correspondent (1980–2019)

Controversy
Neurologist Steven Novella and paranormal investigator Joe Nickell wrote in separate Skeptical Inquirer articles about Erin Moriarty's lack of skepticism and "complete journalistic fail" over a March 2018 segment in which she showed clips of spoon-bender Uri Geller from the 1980s performing "'psychic parlor tricks'" but instead of explaining to her audience that Geller had been debunked many times, with no mention of the work of James Randi. Novella stated of Moriarty "is (most likely) just an old-school journalist who thinks of paranormal pieces as 'fluff' pieces that don't require journalistic rigor." In another segment Moriarty interviewed psychic Angela Dellafiora Ford, who claims that she "psychically tracked down fugitive drug smuggler Charlie Jordan in 1989." Nickell writes that Moriarty "simply takes Ford at her word" and "gushes" over her. Nickell states that Ford's claims are an example of "retrofitting" and incorrect.

Center for Inquiry (CFI) editor Kendrick Frazier wrote of his disappointment that CBS would air a pro-paranormal segment with Geller and a psychic detective. They also classified parapsychologist Dean Radin as a scientist, which he is not. In a tweet the next day in response to criticism, Moriarty wrote, "We reported on government experiments with the paranormal – supported by declassified Govt documents. We gave time to both those involved and scientists." Frazier responded, "Just because some part of the government initiated a bizarre little research program at some point in the past, that is not itself a validation of the claims it was studying." Further research by CFI timed the segment and "found it more than 97 percent pro-paranormal and only 3 percent skeptical". In a press release, CFI called the Sunday Morning segment a "regrettable lapse ... in the ... usually objective and reliable coverage." and called on the program to "take steps to correct the record" and to "provide a more truthful and scientifically rigorous view of this topic."

Awards and nominations

The program won its first Daytime Emmy Award for Outstanding Morning Program in 2013, beating out Today and Good Morning America in the category. It also won a Peabody Award in 2007 for the feature segment "The Way Home."

Nielsen ratings
The program's special food-themed edition on November 24, 2013, earned Sunday Morning one of its highest ratings since February 4, 1996, watched by over 6.25 million total viewers.

This was surpassed by the January 18, 2015, broadcast, which had a total viewership of 6.79 million viewers, the second largest audience the program earned since January 23, 1994.

March 1, 2015: 6.63 million viewers (sixth-largest audience since the 1987 advent of people meters).

March 22, 2020: 6.82 million viewers (largest audience since 1994).

References

External links
 
 

CBS original programming
1979 American television series debuts
1970s American television news shows
1980s American television news shows
1990s American television news shows
2000s American television news shows
2010s American television news shows
2020s American television news shows
Sunday Morning
Peabody Award-winning television programs
Television series by CBS Studios
English-language television shows
Sunday mass media